The Honey Museum is a museum about honey and bees in Gukeng Township, Yunlin County, Taiwan.

Architecture
The entrance to the museum is through a green tunnel with a giant bee model above it. The museum has a large field area for children to play in.

Activities
The museum provides the following activities:
 Honey tasting
 Do-it-yourself honey making
 Talks on honey manufacturing and its products
 Sell honey, royal jelly, pollen, propolis.

Transportation
The museum is accessible by bus towards Meshan from Dounan Station of the Taiwan Railways Administration.

See also
 List of museums in Taiwan

References

External links
  

Food museums in Taiwan
Honey
Bee museums
Museums with year of establishment missing
Museums in Yunlin County